is a dam in Yame, Fukuoka Prefecture, Japan.

References

Dams in Fukuoka Prefecture
Dams completed in 1959